Robin Hood's Quest is a stealth adventure game developed by British studio Broadsword Interactive and released on 16 February 2007 for the Sony PlayStation 2 and Windows.

The game was revealed in January 2007 along with The Quest for Aladdin's Treasure and The Snow Queen Quest. It features the talents of Richard O'Brien and Matthew Macfadyen as characters in the game.

Plot 
Robin Hood's Quest has the player taking on the role of Robin Hood and Will Scarlett, challenging the Sheriff of Nottingham in and attempt to save Maid Marian from Guy of Gisborne. The Protagonists travels through forest and castle environments in medieval England, being assisted by other members of the Merry Men, such as Friar Tuck.

Gameplay 

The Player is challenged with completing various tasks given by your allies. Task's are completed using stealth and puzzle-solving to negotiate around patrolling guards. Despite archery being central to the original legendary figure, there is no bow combat in the game.

Reception 

The game generally received very negative reviews, with the PS2 version having an aggregated score on 15% on Game Rankings

Ace Gamez awarded a poor 1/10 saying, "this shambles of a shell of a sham of a wreck of a ruin of a shadow of a 'dog ate my homework' standard excuse for a game was nothing more than an abominably programmed, hideously simplistic yet almost entirely unplayable piece of garbage". In the same way Strategy Informer said the best moment of the game was "Listening to the fantastically laughable dialogue for the first time and wondering if a game can really be this bad."

References

External Links 
 

2007 video games
Role-playing video games
Windows games
PlayStation 2 games
Robin Hood video games
Video games developed in the United Kingdom
Oxygen Games games
Multiplayer and single-player video games
Broadsword Interactive games